United Nations Security Council resolution 632, adopted unanimously on 16 February 1989, after reaffirming resolutions 431 (1978), 435 (1978) and 629 (1989), the Council endorsed a report by the Secretary-General Javier Pérez de Cuéllar concerning the United Nations plan for Namibia, reiterating its legal authority over the territory until its independence.

The Council stated it would implement Resolution 435 (1978) in its original form to allow free and fair elections in Namibia without intimidation. It also expressed its full support to the Secretary-General and his efforts in the region, requesting him to keep the Council updated and calling on all parties to honour their commitments to the United Nations plan.

In supporting the Secretary-General's report, Resolution 632 therefore fixed the number of personnel as part of the United Nations Transition Assistance Group at 4,650.

See also
 List of United Nations Security Council Resolutions 601 to 700 (1987–1991)
 South African Border War
 Resolutions 629, 640 and 643
 Apartheid
 South West Africa People's Organization
 United Nations Commissioner for Namibia

References

External links
 
Text of the Resolution at undocs.org

 0632
1989 in South Africa
1989 in South West Africa
 0632
 0632
February 1989 events